Álvaro Ruiz (born 8 April 1991) is a Spanish handball player for Orlen Wisła Płock and the Spanish national team.

References

1991 births
Living people
Spanish male handball players
Sportspeople from Almería
Liga ASOBAL players
Expatriate handball players
Expatriate handball players in Poland
Spanish expatriate sportspeople in Poland
Wisła Płock (handball) players